Phyllariopsis purpurascens is a species of large brown algae, found  in the subtidal zone of the Mediterranean Sea and the intertidal zone of Morocco, as observed by Lourenço et al. (2020). While it is functionally similar to kelp species, it is not in the order Laminariales.

In general, this macroalgae is affected by ultraviolet light and avoids shallow waters in the sunny Mediterranean. In fact it was thought that there were no forests of large brown macroalgae, including kelp, in the Mediterranean, until the first was discovered by Jacques Cousteau in his research vessel Calypso in 1958.
Instead the forests grow at greater depths than in other oceans. For example, in the cold upwelling water in the Mediterranean near the Strait of Gibraltar, where Saccorhiza polyschides occurs below , Laminaria ochroleuca below , Phyllariopsis brevipes below  and Phyllariopsis purpurascens below ; the two species of Phyllariopsis also form open communities on the seabed at much greater depths.

References

Tilopteridales
Marine biota of Europe
Plants described in 1987